Vitali Glushchenko can refer to:

 Vitali Glushchenko (footballer) (born 1985), Russian footballer
 Vitali Glushchenko (skier) (born 1977), Russian Olympic skier